Bute and Northern Ayrshire  was a county constituency of the House of Commons of the Parliament of the United Kingdom from 1918 to 1983. It elected one Member of Parliament (MP) by the first past the post voting system.

History
The constituency was formed by combining Buteshire (which historically included the islands of Arran, Great Cumbrae and Little Cumbrae) with part of North Ayrshire. The rest of Ayrshire North was merged into Kilmarnock.

In 1918 the constituency consisted of "The county of Bute, inclusive of all burghs, situated therein, and the county district of Northern Ayr, inclusive of all burghs situated therein except insofar as included in the Ayr District of Burghs".

In 1950 some of the constituency was transferred to the then new constituency of Central Ayrshire.

In 1983, Bute and Northern Ayrshire was divided between Argyll and Bute and Cunninghame North.

Boundaries

Members of Parliament

Election results

Elections in the 1910s

Elections in the 1920s

Elections in the 1930s

General Election 1939–40:
Another General Election was required to take place before the end of 1940. The political parties had been making preparations for an election to take place from 1939 and by the end of this year, the following candidates had been selected; 
Unionist: Charles MacAndrew
Labour:

Elections in the 1940s

Elections in the 1950s

Elections in the 1960s

Elections in the 1970s

See also 
 Former United Kingdom Parliament constituencies

References

Historic parliamentary constituencies in Scotland (Westminster)
Constituencies of the Parliament of the United Kingdom established in 1918
Constituencies of the Parliament of the United Kingdom disestablished in 1983
Politics of the county of Bute
Politics of Ayrshire